The Riga–Lugaži Railway is a  long,  gauge railway in Latvia. It was built in the late 19th century (commencing in 1886) to connect the cities of Riga and Saint Petersburg via Valga and Pskov. The railway was opened in 1889.

The final station in Latvia is Lugaži (near Valka). The railway was last used for the Riga–Saint Petersburg service in 1998, after which St Petersburg trains operated via Rēzekne. For several years there were no cross-border services, and trains terminated at Lugaži, but since 2008 a regular passenger service again operates from Riga to Valga in Estonia twice a day, with an onward connection to Tallinn via a train in Estonia. During the COVID-19 pandemic, the Riga-Lugaži railway cut services to Valga, with trains ending in Lugaži. Service was restored in May of 2020.

Stations

References

Railway lines in Latvia
Transport in Riga
Railway lines opened in 1889
19th-century establishments in Latvia
5 ft gauge railways in Latvia
1889 establishments in the Russian Empire